The Bauman Family is a fruit butter producer in the United States. The fruit butters are produced at a red brick factory in Sassamansville, New Hanover Township, Pennsylvania. The business was established in 1892 by John Bauman. It also sells apple cider.

References

Website
The Bauman Family website

Companies based in Montgomery County, Pennsylvania
Food manufacturers of the United States